The 1914 Belfast East by-election was held on 6 April 1914.  The by-election was held due to the death of the incumbent Irish Unionist MP, Robert McMordie.  It was won by the Irish Unionist candidate Robert Sharman-Crawford, who was unopposed.

Elections in the 1910s

External links 
A Vision Of Britain Through Time

References

1914 elections in the United Kingdom
20th century in Belfast
April 1914 events
East
Unopposed by-elections to the Parliament of the United Kingdom in Irish constituencies
1914 elections in Ireland